The Lorna Croft Friendship Cup was an annual darts match contested between the nations of Germany and the Netherlands.

History 
The event was created as a tribute to and the trophy was named in honour of Lorna Croft, the deceased wife of Olly Croft, the then Chairman of the British Darts Organisation. First held in 2006 as a women's only competition, only in 2013 was a men's competition held for the first time. The 2014 edition was moved to the following March because both darts associations had full schedules.

Both teams consisted of eight women and eight men. The women competed against one other in singles and pairs events and a team competition. Likewise for the men. A singles tournament was held on the last day that offered both the men's and women's winners entry in the qualifying rounds for the World Masters. The points totals from the men's and women's events were then added together for a combined score to determine the overall winner of the competition.

The 2015 edition of the competition was the last, because as of 2016, it and the Challenge of the Lowlands tournament will be replaced with a new event featuring the four nations of Belgium, Germany, Luxembourg and the Netherlands.

Winners

Singles Finals

References

External links 
Lorna Croft Friendship Cup Dutch Darts Association.

Darts in the Netherlands